Krag may refer to:

Krag (surname)
Firearms associated with Ole Herman Johannes Krag:
Krag–Jørgensen rifle
Krag–Petersson rifle
.30-40 Krag
Krag–Jørgensen pistol
Krag Mountains, Canada
Krag, British Columbia, a ghost town in Canada

See also
Krąg (disambiguation)